Gings is an unincorporated community in Union Township, Rush County, in the U.S. state of Indiana.

History
Gings was platted in 1870, and named for its founder, Michael Ging. An old variant name of the community was called Star.

A post office was established under the name Star in 1853, was renamed Gings in 1890 and remained in operation until it was discontinued in 1905.

Geography

References

Unincorporated communities in Rush County, Indiana
Unincorporated communities in Indiana